Beryllium sulfide (BeS) is an ionic compound from the sulfide group  with the formula BeS. It is a white solid with a sphalerite structure that is decomposed by water and acids.

Preparation
Beryllium sulfide powders can be prepared by the reaction of sulfur and beryllium in a hydrogen atmosphere by heating the mixture for 10-20 minutes at temperatures from 1000-1300 °C.  If done at 900 °C, there is beryllium metal impurities.

Alternatively, it can be prepared by the reaction of beryllium chloride and hydrogen sulfide at 900 °C.

References

Beryllium compounds
Sulfides
II-VI semiconductors
Zincblende crystal structure